KQNK-FM (106.7 FM) is a radio station licensed to Norton, Kansas, United States. The station airs a Classic hits format, and is currently owned by Dierking Communications, Inc.

The station's programming is also simulcast on KQNK (AM).

References

External links
KQNK's website

QNK
Classic hits radio stations in the United States